The 2011 Over the Limit was the second annual Over the Limit professional wrestling pay-per-view (PPV) event produced by WWE. It was held for wrestlers from the promotion's Raw and SmackDown brand divisions. The event took place on May 22, 2011, at the KeyArena in Seattle, Washington. The name "Over the Limit" was a reference to its main event match being contested as an "I Quit" match. It was the final Over the Limit held during the first brand extension, which ended in August.

Nine matches took place during the event, eight of which were broadcast live on pay-per-view. In the main event, John Cena retained Raw's WWE Championship by defeating The Miz in an "I Quit" match. Elsewhere on the card, Wade Barrett retained SmackDown's Intercontinental Championship against Ezekiel Jackson, Big Show and Kane retained the WWE Tag Team Championship against The New Nexus (CM Punk and Mason Ryan), Brie Bella retained the WWE Divas Championship against Kelly Kelly, and Randy Orton retained SmackDown's World Heavyweight Championship against Christian.

Over the Limit received 140,000 buys worldwide, significantly down from the 2010 edition's 197,000 buys.

Production

Background
In 2010, WWE discontinued their previously annual May pay-per-view (PPV) Judgment Day and replaced it with a new PPV titled Over the Limit. The name "Over the Limit" was a reference to its main event match being contested as an "I Quit" match. In April 2011, the promotion ceased going by its full name of World Wrestling Entertainment, with "WWE" becoming an orphaned initialism. Over the Limit then returned in May as the second event in the Over the Limit annual chronology and again featured an "I Quit" match as the main event. It took place on May 22, 2011, at the KeyArena in Seattle, Washington and featured wrestlers from the Raw and SmackDown brands.

Storylines
The professional wrestling matches at Over the Limit featured professional wrestlers performing as characters in scripted events pre-determined by the hosting promotion, WWE. Storylines between the characters were produced on WWE's weekly television shows Raw and SmackDown with the Raw and SmackDown brands—storyline divisions in which WWE assigned its employees to different programs.

The main feud from the Raw brand heading into Over the Limit was between John Cena and The Miz over the WWE Championship. John Cena won the WWE Championship from The Miz in a triple threat steel cage match that also featured John Morrison at Extreme Rules. The Miz invoked his rematch clause the following night. He initially won the match by hitting Cena with the WWE Championship belt, but the referee immediately reversed his decision after seeing the belt in the ring. Thus, The Miz was disqualified and Cena retained the championship via disqualification. On the May 9 episode of Raw, The Miz defeated Rey Mysterio and Alberto Del Rio to earn another shot at the WWE Championship. Later that night, Cena announced that their match would be an "I Quit" match.

The main feud on the SmackDown brand was between Randy Orton and Christian over the World Heavyweight Championship. At Extreme Rules, Christian defeated Alberto Del Rio in a Ladder match to win his first World Heavyweight Championship. On the following episode of SmackDown, aired on May 6, Randy Orton defeated Christian to win the World Heavyweight Championship. The following week, it was announced that Christian would invoke his rematch clause against Randy Orton at Over the Limit.

An ongoing feud involved Raw commentators Michael Cole and Jerry Lawler. At WrestleMania XXVII, Lawler made Cole submit to the ankle lock, but the anonymous Raw General Manager reversed the special guest referee, Stone Cold Steve Austin's decision, making Cole the winner via disqualification. At Extreme Rules, Cole teamed up with Jack Swagger to face and defeat Lawler and Jim Ross in a tag team Country Whipping match after Cole pinned Jim Ross. On Raw on May 9, Lawler challenged Cole to another match with a stipulation that Lawler would give him his Hall of Fame Ring and, should Cole be honored, personally induct him into the WWE Hall of Fame. After an altercation, Jack Swagger agreed to the match on behalf of Cole. A contract signing for the match took place on the May 16 where it was revealed after the contract was signed that the match is also going to be a "Kiss My Foot" match, where the loser must kiss the winner's feet.

Another feud from the SmackDown brand involved former allies Intercontinental Champion Wade Barrett, and the rest of The Corre, against Ezekiel Jackson. At Extreme Rules, Barrett and Jackson faced the WWE Tag Team Champions Big Show and Kane. Ezekiel had the early advantage in the match. However, Barrett tagged himself in the match just to get pinned by Big Show. The following week, Jackson decided to leave the Corre. Later that night, his former teammates Heath Slater, Justin Gabriel, and Barrett attacked him in the locker room. On May 13, on SmackDown, Barrett challenged Jackson to a match at Over the Limit for the WWE Intercontinental Championship.

Another feud from the Raw brand involved R-Truth and Rey Mysterio Jr. On May 9, Mysterio and R-Truth, along with The Miz and Alberto Del Rio had a confrontation over the number one contendership to the WWE Championship. The anonymous Raw General Manager, however, announced that only Mysterio, Del Rio and The Miz were to compete for the number one contendership in a Triple Threat match. R-Truth still believes that he is better than the other three, especially Rey Mysterio. After the Triple Threat match, which was won by The Miz, Truth attacked Mysterio in the ring. The following week, R-Truth announced that he will face Mysterio at Over the Limit.

On May 16, it was announced that the WWE Tag Team Champions The Big Show and Kane would defend their title against Mason Ryan and CM Punk from the New Nexus at Over the Limit.

On SmackDown, on May 20, it was announced that Brie Bella would defend her WWE Divas Championship against Kelly Kelly at Over the Limit. On the same night, Chavo Guerrero announced that he would be facing Sin Cara.

Event

Preliminary matches
The event opened with R-Truth facing Rey Mysterio. R-Truth performed a Shut Up on Mysterio to win the match.

Next, Wade Barrett defended the Intercontinental Championship against Ezekiel Jackson. In the end, Jackson applied the Torture Rack on Barrett but Justin Gabriel interfered, resulting in Jackson winning by disqualification.

After that, Sin Cara faced Chavo Guerrero Jr. Sin Cara performed a Tilt-A-Whirl Headscissors Takedown on Guerrero to win the match.

In the fourth match, Big Show and Kane defended the WWE Tag Team Championship against The New Nexus (CM Punk and Mason Ryan). The match ended when Big Show and Kane performed a double Chokeslam on Ryan to retain the title.

Later, Brie Bella defended the WWE Divas Championship against Kelly Kelly. Brie performed a Bella Buster on Kelly to retain the title.

Main event matches
In the sixth match, Randy Orton defended the World Heavyweight Championship against Christian. During the match, Orton attempted a Punt Kick but Christian performed a Spear on Orton for a near-fall. In the climax, Christian attempted a Killswitch but Orton and performed an RKO on Christian to retain the title.

In the seventh match, Jerry Lawler faced Michael Cole in a Kiss My Foot. Lawler performed a Diving Fist Drop on Cole to win the match. After the match, Eve performed a diving Moonsault on Cole, Jim Ross poured barbecue sauce over Cole and Bret Hart applied the sharpshooter on Cole whilst Cole kissed Lawler’s foot.

In the main event, John Cena defended the WWE Championship against The Miz in an "I Quit" match. At the start of the match, Cena took control of The Miz whilst attacking Alex Riley. Cena applied the STF on Miz but Riley broke the hold. Cena performed an Attitude Adjustment on Miz but Riley hit Cena with a briefcase. After Miz and Riley double-teamed Cena, The Miz performed a Snap DDT onto the steel steps but Cena refused to quit. Cena managed to push Riley into the ring post but The Miz hit Cena with a chair. Cena took control of The Miz and Cena pushed Riley, knocking him into the referee. When Riley asked Cena whether he wanted to quit, Cena was heard saying “I quit”, seemingly resulting in The Miz winning the title. After the referee heard a recording of Cena saying “I quit”, the match was restarted. Cena performed an Attitude Adjustment on Riley through the broadcast table and hit The Miz with a leather belt whilst The Miz ran up the entrance ramp. Cena applied the STF on The Miz, who quit, resulting in Cena retaining the title.

Reception
Over The Limit 2011 received mixed reviews from critics, in his review for The Sun, Rob McNichol reported that the main event saw John Cena in a "typical 'superman' performance, Cena suffered a torturous beating before recovering to beat the former champion". "It was an old-fashioned, Hogan-esque performance which the young fans who look to Cena as a superhero would have adored, while many purists would have cringed at the contrived narrative".

The Smackdown main event and both wrestlers involved were highly praised, being described as "a tremendous match that will no doubt gain universal praise" and that "Christian has developed into a very accomplished wrestler, and Orton is arguably the best all rounder in the game right now, so a cracking match was not a surprise".

The opening bout between Rey Mysterio vs R Truth was mentioned as being "a satisfactory opening match" and adding that "R-Truth entering the arena to no music — another nice touch in the development in Ron Killings' new heel persona".

Sin Cara beat Chavo Guerrero in what was "virtually a showcase match for the former Mistico, but once again the masked Mexican failed to truly shine, making a hash of the finish".

The match between Jerry Lawler and Michael Cole was mixed, but Jim Ross and Bret Hart's appearances were praised by critics.

The Sun awarded WWE Over the Limit 2011 8 out of 10.

Aftermath
The 2011 Over the Limit was the last Over the Limit held during the first brand extension, which ended in August.

Results

References

External links
Official Over the Limit website

2011
Events in Seattle
2011 in Seattle
Professional wrestling in Seattle
2011 WWE pay-per-view events
May 2011 events in the United States